Wahconah Falls State Park is a small Massachusetts state park in the town of Dalton managed by the Department of Conservation and Recreation. The park protects the scenic waterfall for which it is named.

Wahconah Falls are created where Wahconah Falls Brook makes four individual drops, tumbling over an outcrop of the Becket Gneiss formation. The falls have been described as "rather photogenic" depending on time of year.

Visitors can hike, fish, and picnic. Swimming is not allowed, but wading is possible.

References

External links
Wahconah Falls State Park Department of Conservation and Recreation

State parks of Massachusetts
Parks in Berkshire County, Massachusetts
Dalton, Massachusetts